René Crepin (3 January 1899 – 5 November 1976) was a French racing cyclist. He rode in the 1928 Tour de France.

References

External links
 

1899 births
1976 deaths
French male cyclists
Place of birth missing